Bob Jones was a British sound engineer. He was nominated for an Academy Award in the category Best Sound for the film Mary, Queen of Scots. He worked on over 100 films between 1952 and 1985.

Selected filmography
 Mary, Queen of Scots (1971)

References

External links

Year of birth missing
Year of death missing
British audio engineers